The 2015–16 Korfbal League season is the 10th season of the Korfbal League since its establishment in 2005. PKC are the defending champions. At the end of the season Dalto relegated direct. AW.DTV went to the play-off to stay in.

Teams

A total of 10 teams will be taking part in the league: The best eight teams from the 2014-15 season, one direct promotion from the Hoofdklasse and one promotion/relegation play-off winner.

Regular Season Table

Final Stages

References

External links
 Official website Korfbal League

Korfball in the Netherlands